Amitabh Mitra is an Indian-born South African physician, poet and artist, whose paintings depict dramatised stick figures.

Education and career
Mitra studied medicine and did postgraduate studies in orthopaedic surgery at the Gajara Raja Medical College, Jiwaji University, Gwalior, India. He further specialised in aerospace medicine and family medicine at the University of Pretoria, South Africa.

A practitioner of orthopaedic surgery and trauma surgery, currently working at the Accident and Emergency unit of Cecilia Makiwane Hospital, Mdantsane, South Africa, he has published twelve volumes of poetry and exhibited his poetry art. Mitra figures in the international roster of physician poets, a massive roster of ancient and contemporary poets / writers maintained by Daniel Bryant and assisted by Suzanne Poirer, Professor of Literature and Medical Education, University of Illinois, USA He represented South Africa at the World Literature Festival in Oslo 2008. Amitabh Mitra is listed in 78 Notable Alumni of University of Pretoria 

On 30 November 2022, Dr Amitabh Mitra received the South African Police Service Provincial Commissioner's Ambassador Award Eastern Cape Excellence Awards at Port Elizabeth.

Artistic influences

A major section of Mitra's work on art and poetry is devoted to Gwalior, where he grew up. His close friendship with the Maratha royal families resulted in his drawing a series of watercolour involving poetry which he exhibited in South Africa and India. A Slow Train to Gwalior is a coffee-table book of his art and poetry; a compact disc of his recitation with a backdrop of African traditional music was released by the Premier of Eastern Cape, Nosimo Balindlela, and a short documentary film on his Gwalior poetry was shown at the Grahamstown National Arts Festival in 2009. In 2007 he was invited by the Sahitya Akademi, New Delhi, where he presented his work to a poetry-loving audience.

As surgeon
Mitra's work in trauma surgery took him to Bhutan, where he worked at high-altitude hospitals of Chukha, Tsimalakha, Chimakothi and Thimphu under severe conditions. During these times he wrote poems about Bhutan, some of which were translated into French. He wrote about his adventures in his search for the utopian Shangri La.
Khushwant Singh, the former editor of The Illustrated Weekly of India visited him to his hospital in Bhutan and wrote about him in his weekly columns, "With Malice Towards One and All" in the Times of India during the 1980s. Mitra later went to Arunachal Pradesh, where he joined as an orthopaedic surgeon at Along.
He joined as an orthopaedic surgeon at Bulawayo, Zimbabwe, in 1993. He lived in Bulawayo's Mzilikazi township and narrated his experiences during the time of political turmoil.
His close interest in Sports Medicine have assisted boxers in Mdantsane. Mdantsane, the second biggest black township is known for producing world boxing champions. Among them is Zolani Tete who held the WBO Bantamweight title from 2017 to 2019. Dr. Mitra is the Medical Advisor and Surgeon to Zolani Tete and gave him the medical clearance needed to fight the Commonwealth Championship in UK March 2022.

As artist
His present art is about the black township of Mdantsane, where he works at the Cecilia Makiwane Hospital.
Mdantsane Breathing is his book on the art and poetry of Mdantsane.

On 15 December 2018, Mitra received the Provincial Eastern Cape Minister of Art and Culture's Special Award in the category of Fine Arts for his continued dedication to South African Arts.

Mitra gifted the charcoal portrait done by him of Neil Aggett on 21 March 2019 at the 13th Annual Neil Aggett Memorial Lecture at Kingswood College, Grahamstown. The lecture takes place each year to celebrate the life of Aggett and to honour his legacy. Mitra was a special guest at this year's lecture as he presented the school with a charcoal drawing that he drew of Aggett. This drawing is one very few visual representations of Aggett and will be displayed in the Kingswood College Museum.

The University of Cape Town honors and commemorates woman heroes of anti-apartheid struggle which includes Cecilia Makiwane. A charcoal portrait of Cecilia Makiwane done by Mitra was exhibited at the Molly Blackburn Hall, University of Cape Town campus on 19 September 2019.

Dr. Mitra lectures on aesthetic values of art in medicine and pushes actively to add art as a subject in the graduate curriculum of medicine and surgery in universities worldwide. He enjoys taking junior medical doctors on a tour to local galleries and allows a vibrant conversation between them and fellow artists. His core interests are on burnt out Accident and Emergency doctors and rejuvenating them through art.
Dr. Mitra in an interview to Medbrief Africa mentioned, "Unfortunately, nobody’s yet quantified the number of emergency healthcare workers who’ve succumbed to or suffered from burnout, but it’s serious and way overdue -particularly among our youngsters." 

The 2021 National Arts Festival, Grahamstown, South Africa honored Dr. Mitra by making a short film on his visual art and reasons for fusing Arts with Medicine.

As poet
He translated the Bengali poetry of the late Prabhatkiran Bose, well known children's author in Bengal during the 1950s.

Mitra's art and poetry on the township of Mdantsane, South Africa, was exhibited at the 2011 International Symposium for Poetry and Medicine and Hippocrates Prize for Poetry and Medicine Awards on Saturday, 7 May 2011, entitled Poems from Cecilia Makiwane Hospital.

Splinters of a Mirage Dawn, An Anthology of Migrant Poetry of South Africa (co-edited with Naomi Nkealah) was short listed for the National Humanities and Social Sciences Award, South Africa, 2016. Dr. Mitra's latest poetry book, Anarchy and the Sea encompassing Covid 19 feelings, violence and trauma he encounters in Emergency Medicine and impasto seascapes of violent storms he paints are reflected in this coffee table book. This book will be launched in the prestigious National Art Festival, Grahamstown, South Africa on 14 July 2021.

Three of Amitabh Mitra's Poetry Films were selected and screened on 12 October 2021 at Durban International Film Festival and Poetry Africa followed by a discussion. Visualizing Poetry: Illuminating the Words

Amitabh Mitra was selected, and he performed at the Madibaland @ Bookbedonnerd World Literary Festival on 3 November 2022 09 am onwards

Dr. Amitabh Mitra and Zena Velloo John edited a book of poems titled, Anthology of Women Poets of India and South Africa, Feminism, Reflections in Contemporary Politics. The book was launched at the Jaipur Literature and Arts Conclave, Gwalior, India on 19 December 20222.

In politics
Dr. Amitabh Mitra was the National Secretary General of South African Foreign Qualified Doctor's Association, consisting of 3,800 foreign qualified specialists and doctors who after the fusion of former Bantustans into the new republic of South Africa were not given due recognition. Dr. Mitra fought a legal battle for the rightful acceptance and registration they deserved. Such doctors and their families suffered a professional and social trauma and most of them decided to leave for UK, Australia and Canada where they were welcomed and given the dignity they deserved. The Mail and Guardian, South Africa's prominent newspaper mentioned that in spite of highly qualified doctors remaining within the country, around 210 Cuban doctors were brought in under the programme earlier this year, with their flights – totaling $300 000 – paid for by the South African government. In many provinces, the recruits enjoy free furnished accommodation and official transport between their home and place of work. Out of the three thousand eight hundred foreign qualified doctors in 1996, today only 50 of such doctors remain in South Africa, still not recognized and on a limited registration. In the present Covid Pandemic, the Government has showed a step child treatment, registering Cuban Doctors within 72 hours as compared to years and beyond for Foreign Qualified Doctors.

Bibliography

Poetry
Bithika  – 1978
Ritual Silences – 1980
A Slow Train to Gwalior – 2009
Leaping the Lilac Sun – 2009
Mdantsane Breathing – 2010
Poems for Haiti, A South African Anthology (Foreword by Professor Peter Horn) – 2010
Unbreaking the Rainbow, Voices of Protest from New South Africa (Foreword by Ela Gandhi) – 2012
Splinters of a Mirage Dawn, Anthology of Migrant Poetry from South Africa (co-edited with Naomi Nkealah) (Art by Arpana Caur) – 2013
Stranger than a Sun, Poems and Drawings of Gwalior – 2015
Trainstorm, An Anthology of Alternative Train Poetry – 2016
Anarchy and the Sea, (Poems and Seascapes of Amitabh Mitra) – 2021Anthology of Women Poets of India and South Africa (co-edited with Zena Velloo John ) - 2022
EditorA Hudson View, A Quarterly Print Poetry JournalInyathi, A Journal on South African Arts

Compact disc of poetry and musicA Slow Train to Gwalior – 2007

Appearances in the following poetry Anthologies
 Travelogue : The Grand Indian Express'' (2018) ed. by Dr. Ananad Kumar and published by Authorspress, New Delhi

References

External links
 
 
 
 
 
 
 
 
 
 

University of Pretoria alumni
Living people
20th-century South African poets
People from Gwalior
English-language poets from India
South African people of Indian descent
Jiwaji University alumni
Year of birth missing (living people)
Place of birth missing (living people)
Bengali male poets
21st-century South African poets
20th-century Bengali poets
21st-century Bengali poets
20th-century South African male writers
21st-century South African male writers